Cabine C (Portuguese for "Cabin C") was a short-lived Brazilian post-punk band from São Paulo. With their sonority inspired by acts such as Siouxsie and the Banshees, The Cure, Cocteau Twins and Talking Heads, and vocalist Ciro Pessoa's lyrics influenced by Romantic and Symbolist poets such as Edgar Allan Poe, Charles Baudelaire and Arthur Rimbaud, and by playwright Antonin Artaud, they are considered to be one of the first and most famous Brazilian gothic rock bands (even though Pessoa publicly rejected any associations with the goth subculture at the time), as well as forerunners of the cold wave movement in Brazil.

Despite their short lifespan, they have a strong cult following to the present day.

History
Cabine C was formed in 1984 by Ciro Pessoa, who had parted ways with his previous band, Titãs, the year prior. Its initial line-up comprised Pessoa on vocals, his then-wife Wania Forghieri on keyboards, Edgard Scandurra of Ira! on guitar, Charles Gavin (who had just joined Titãs) on drums and Sandra Coutinho of Mercenárias on bass (Sandra later left the band and was replaced by Ricardo Gaspa, also from Ira!). They recorded some songs with this line-up, and performed some shows in bars and clubhouses of São Paulo, but with the exception of Pessoa and Forghieri, everybody would leave the band afterwards, in order to focus on their respective alternate projects.

In 1986, former Akira S. e as Garotas que Erraram members Anna Ruth dos Santos and Marinella Setti joined Cabine C, and with this line-up they would release in the same year their first (and only) studio album, Fósforos de Oxford, through RPM Discos, so called because it was founded by RPM members Paulo Ricardo and Luiz Schiavon. The album, which counted with guest appearances by Fernando Deluqui and Akira Tsukimoto (the titular "Akira S." of Akira S. e as Garotas que Erraram), was well-received, but suffered from bad promotion, resulting that most people didn't even know it existed, and so it was a commercial failure. Because of that, a lengthy judicial battle between Cabine C and RPM Discos ensued then, resulting in the end of both Cabine C and RPM Discos in 1987.

Prior to their disbanding, Cabine C was working on a second studio album, which would be called Cotonetes Desconexos; however, the project did not come to fruition.

Their song "Tão Perto" ("So Close") is present in the compilation of Brazilian underground post-punk music The Sexual Life of the Savages, released in 2005 by British label Soul Jazz Records. In 2017, Pessoa wrote a song in tribute to Cabine C entitled "Cabine C/Na Primavera", for the self-titled debut album of his latest project Flying Chair. He died on May 5, 2020, following complications from a cancer and COVID-19.

Members
 Ciro Pessoa – vocals , electric guitar 
 Wania Forghieri – keyboards 
 Anna Ruth dos Santos – bass, backing vocals 
 Marinella Setti – drums 
 Edgard Scandurra – electric guitar 
 Charles Gavin – drums 
 Sandra Coutinho – bass 
 Ricardo Gaspa – bass

Discography

Studio albums

Compilations

Unreleased songs
 "Cotonetes Desconexos"
 "Recado Chinês"
 "Nossas Cabeças São Nossos Erros"
 "Inundação de Amor" (written by Ciro Pessoa and Júlio Barroso of Gang 90 e as Absurdettes, it would later be performed by Ira!)
 "A História do Meu Delírio"
 "O Lado Bom da Bomba" (written by Ciro Pessoa and Branco Mello)

References

External links
 An article about the band's history 

Brazilian rock music groups
Cold wave groups
Musical groups established in 1984
Musical groups disestablished in 1987
Brazilian post-punk music groups
Brazilian gothic rock groups
Musical quartets
Musical groups from São Paulo
1984 establishments in Brazil
1987 disestablishments in Brazil